This is a list of Canadian royal commissions or commissions of inquiry since Confederation.

In Canada, royal commissions and commissions of inquiry are official Government inquiries into matters of national concern, either in order to look into an important general issue or to fully investigate a specific incident. They are appointed by the Governor in Council (Cabinet) according to the Inquiries Act, and consist of a panel of distinguished individuals, experts, or judges. The terms of reference for the commission and the powers and the names of the commissioners are officially stated by an Order-in-Council. Once their task is complete, the findings of the commission are reported to Cabinet and the Prime Minister for appropriate action. The Crown in right of each province can also appoint a royal commission, although they are not included in this list. Federal inquiries are limited to matters within the constitutional jurisdiction of the Parliament of Canada. They can only look at issues within provincial jurisdiction that are connected to federal jurisdiction, such as policing on-reserve, child welfare on-reserve, etc.

While a commission's findings and recommendations are non-binding, many have a significant impact on public opinion and the shape of public policy.

Other types of federal public inquiries include task forces and departmental investigations. Since the 1991–1996 Royal Commission on Aboriginal Peoples, commissions have more commonly been referred to as Commissions of Inquiry. From Confederation till 2013, there have been almost 450 federal commissions of inquiry with and without the royal title; more than 1500 departmental investigations; and an undetermined number of task forces.

Commissions are often referred to by the name of the chairperson or commissioner(s). For example, a commission headed by John Doe may commonly be known as the "Doe Commission".

Overview 

In Canada, royal commissions and commissions of inquiry are official Government inquiries into matters of national concern, either in order to look into and secure advice for an issue of general importance or to fully investigate a specific contentious incident.

They are appointed by Governor in Council (Cabinet) according to the Inquiries Act (first passed by Parliament in 1868), and consist of a panel of distinguished individuals, experts, or judges. The terms of reference for the commission and the powers and the names of the commissioners are officially stated by an Order-in-Council. Once their task is complete, the findings of the commission are reported to Cabinet and the Prime Minister for appropriate action.

In practice, royal commissions in Canada can be seen as Commissions of Inquiry under the Great Seal of Canada that carry a royal title. Though apart from this distinction there is no effective difference between the two, royal commissions tend to be thought of as broader in scope than other public inquiries, often holding nationwide public hearings and publishing associated research reports as well as their formal findings and recommendations.

There are several different kinds of Commissions of Inquiry, which can be established under either Part I or Part II of the Inquiries Act, or any one of 87 or more federal statutes. The mandate of a Commission of Inquiry depends on the nature of the issue to be considered.

 Advisory Commissions — usually have a broad mandate in order to ensure that commissioners consider all options and consult all parties with an interest in the matter.
 Investigative Commissions — usually have a more specific, focused mandate.

Commissions of Inquiry created under Part I of the Inquiries Act are considered to government departments for the purposes of the Financial Administration Act (FAA). Oftentimes, the Prime Minister is given responsibility for the commission for the purposes of the FAA, thus enabling the commission to receive administrative support from the Privy Council Office.

Other types of public inquiry in Canada that are closely related to royal commissions include:

 Task forces — Typically composed of knowledgeable practitioners, task forces are often appointed by government departments to conduct concentrated investigations into specific practical matters. In the past, they have been assigned to look into such matters as privacy and computers; immigration procedures, retirement income policy, labour market development, fisheries policy, and sports. Though usually not as broad as royal commissions, some task forces have dealt with broad Canadian issues such as housing and urban development, government information, and the structure and foreign ownership of Canadian industry.
 Departmental investigations — Investigations can be established by departments and other agencies under statutory powers of the Inquiries Act.

The Inquiries Act provides commissions of inquiry, royal commissions, task forces, and departmental investigations the power to conduct investigations by subpoenaing witnesses, taking evidence under oath, requisitioning documents, and hiring expert staff. Federal inquiries are limited to matters within the constitutional jurisdiction of the Parliament of Canada. They can only look at issues within provincial jurisdiction that are connected to federal jurisdiction, such as policing on-reserve, child welfare on-reserve, etc.

Royal Commissions

Since the Royal Commission on Aboriginal Peoples, commissions have more commonly been referred to as Commissions of Inquiry.

Commissions of Inquiry

Task forces

Task forces are commissions of inquiry often appointed by government departments to conduct concentrated investigations into specific practical matters. In the past, they have been assigned to look into such matters as privacy and computers; immigration procedures, retirement income policy, labour market development, fisheries policy, and sports. Though usually not as broad as royal commissions, some task forces have dealt with broad Canadian issues such as housing and urban development, government information, and the structure and foreign ownership of Canadian industry.

Other public inquiries

Many of these are task forces in miniature.

Provincial commissions and inquiries

See also
 Public inquiry
 List of Canadian tribunals

References

External links
Privy Council Office. Commissions of Inquiry - Canada.ca, Government of Canada, 18 Nov. 2019

 
 

Canadian Royal Commissions
Dynamic lists
Canadian